Glenn Floyd is an American lawyer and politician from Oklahoma .

Floyd established a private legal practice in 1970.  He  served in the Oklahoma House of Representatives from 1973 to 1978 as a Democrat from District 45

References

Living people
Date of birth missing (living people)
Oklahoma lawyers
Democratic Party members of the Oklahoma House of Representatives
20th-century Members of the Oklahoma House of Representatives
Year of birth missing (living people)